The 1989 United Jersey Bank Classic was a women's tennis tournament played on outdoor hard courts in Mahwah, New Jersey in the United States that was part of the Category 3 tier of the 1989 WTA Tour. It was the 12th and last edition of the tournament and was held from August 14 through August 20, 1989. First-seeded Steffi Graf won the singles title and earned $40,000 first-prize money.

Finals

Singles

 Steffi Graf defeated  Andrea Temesvári 7–5, 6–2
 It was Graf's 10th singles title of the year and the 40th of her career.

Doubles

 Steffi Graf /  Pam Shriver defeated  Louise Allen /  Laura Gildemeister 6–2, 6–4
 It was Graf's 11th title of the year and the 49th of her career. It was Shriver's 6th title of the year and the 122nd of her career.

References

External links
 ITF tournament edition details
 Tournament draws

United Jersey Bank Classic
WTA New Jersey
United Jersey Bank Classic
United Jersey Bank Classic
United Jersey Bank Classic